Timothy Alden (February 3, 1823 – December 4, 1858), was an American inventor, known for The Alden-type, a typesetting machine.

Biography 
Alden was born at Barnstable, Massachusetts, on February 3, 1823, sixth in descent from John Alden, the Puritan. Other sources refers he was born on June 14, 1819. When very young he was apprenticed to his brother, who was a printer, and at the age of seventeen began to plan a machine "for setting and distributing type".

It took five years for his crude idea to develop into a practical reality, and then he produced a composing and distributing machine, the type arranged in cells around the circumference of a horizontal wheel, as the wheel revolves the receivers pick up the type as directed by the operator. He removed to New York City in 1846, and thenceforth applied himself sedulously to his favourite idea with such success, that a practical, though imperfect, machine was completed and patented in various countries in 1856; the English patent is No. 3089, December 29, 1856, "for settings and distributing printing types." The U.S. patent is No. 18175, on September 15, 1857, with classifications "details of, or accessories for, machines for mechanical composition using matrices for individual characters which are selected and assembled for type casting or moulding" and "arrangements or devices for distributing matrices or space bands after casting or moulding."

This machine was improved by his brother Henry W. Alden, after the death of Timothy, and was the pioneer in type-setting machines in the United States, although it did not come into extensive practical use. He died in New York City, on December 4, 1858.

Notes

Sources 
 
 
 

Attribution

External links
 

1823 births
1859 deaths
19th-century American inventors
People from Barnstable, Massachusetts
Burials at Green-Wood Cemetery
Inventors from Massachusetts